MasterChef Romania is the Romanian version of the television cooking game show, open to amateur and home chefs. The first series started in March 2012 and was broadcast by Pro TV channel in Romania. The show was hosted by Romanian actor Răzvan Fodor. The panel was completed by Cătălin Scărlătescu, Sorin Bontea and Florin Dumitrescu. They were replaced in season 4 by Patrizia Paglieri, Adrian Hădean and Florin Scripcă Starting with the 6th Season, the MasterChef panel has been replaced by chefs Răzvan Exarhu, Samuel le Torriellec and Liviu Popescu. Seventh season had the panel was once again replaced by Joseph Hadad, Cosmin Tudoran and Silviu Chelaru, former participant of the show.

The first season started on 20 March 2012 on PRO TV and lasted until 6 June.

The second season was broadcast between 5 March and 28 May 2013.

The third season was broadcast between 18 March and 10 June 2014.

The fourth season started on 15 September 2014 and concluded on 23 December 2014.

The fifth season started on 14 September 2015 and lasted until 14 December 2015.

The sixth season started on 13 February 2017 and lasted until 15 May 2017.

The seventh season starts on 9 September 2019.

The eight season starts on 12 January 2022.

Challenges

Of all the amateur chefs who audition nationwide, one hundred are chosen to cook their signature dish for the three judges. Each judge takes a taste of the dish and gives his opinion before voting a "yes" or a "no". At least two "yes" votes are required to earn a white MasterChef apron, allowing the competitor to advance.

In the Mystery Box challenge, contestants receive a number of ingredients of which they are to make a dish of their choice. The contestants are allowed to use any number of the ingredients they wish, and are free to leave any ingredients out. Once the dishes are finished, the judges choose three of the dishes to taste. The winner receives an advantage in the following elimination challenge.

The off-site team challenge involves the contestants being split into two teams, blue and red, which consist of equal numbers and are given a task, for example, running a restaurant or catering for a party or wedding. After the task has been completed, the teams are given the results, which can be determined by third party votes. Members of the losing team compete in an elimination challenge.

A "pressure test" challenge involves competitors who failed in a previous challenge (i.e. the three worst performers in an individual challenge or the losing team in a group challenge). The competitors are given a dish that they then must create in a particular time frame. Once the contestants have finished cooking, the dishes are taken to the judges to be tasted, who then criticize, vote and eliminate one or more contestants.

Seasons

Series summary

Overview
The first episode aired on 20 March 2012. The winner was 23-year-old office manager, Petru Buiucă, who defeated Mimi Nicolae in the grand final. Buiucă received a cheque of 50,000 euros.

The second season started on 5 March 2013. The grand prize was won by Aida Parascan, a housewife that lives with her family in Italy, but came especially back to Romania to take part at the show. The prize remained the same, 50,000 euros.

The third season started on 18 March 2014.

The fourth season started on 15 September 2014. The winner of this season was announced on 23 December 2014 and is Ciprian Ogarcă.

The fifth season started on 14 September 2015. The winner of this season was announced on 14 December 2015 and is Andrei Voica.

The sixth season was on air in spring 2017. The winner of this season is Robert Petrescu.

Season 1

References

2012 Romanian television series debuts
Romania
Pro TV original programming
Romanian reality television series
Romanian television series based on British television series